Hodson is an English patronymic surname meaning 'son of Hodge'. Notable people with the surname include:

Alexander Carlton Hodson (1906–1996), American entomologist
Arnold Weinholt Hodson, British colonial administrator
Ashley Hodson, English footballer
Bert Hodson, Welsh professional golfer
Bill Hodson, Australian politician
Bridget Hodson, British actress
Christina Hodson, British screenwriter
Christopher Hodson, New Zealand barrister and judge
Christopher Hodson, 17th century bell-founder
Edward Hodson, English cricketer
Frodsham Hodson, principal of Brasenose College, Oxford
Geoffrey Hodson (1886–1983), occultist, Theosophist, mystic, Liberal Catholic priest, philosopher and esotericist
George Hodson, American baseball player
George Hodson, Anglican priest
George Stacey Hodson, British World War I flying ace
Gordon Hodson, Canadian psychologist
Hannah Hodson, American actress
Harry Hodson, British journalist and economist
James Lansdale Hodson (1891-1956), British novelist, scriptwriter and journalist
Joseph York Hodsdon (1836–1901), Maine state senator
Kevin Hodson, Canadian ice hockey player
Lee Hodson, Northern Irish footballer
Mark Hodson, Anglican bishop
Phineas Hodson, British cleric
Steve Hodson, British actor
Thomas Hodson, British missionary
Thomas Callan Hodson, British academic
Tom Hodson (1990), rugby league, and rugby union footballer of the 2010s
Tommy Hodson, American football quarterback of the 1990s
William Stephen Raikes Hodson, British soldier

See also
 Hudson (disambiguation)
 Hodgson

References 

English-language surnames